The People's Party of the Balearic Islands (PP) is the regional section of the People's Party of Spain (PP) in the Balearic Islands. It was formed in 1989 from the re-foundation of the People's Alliance.

Presidents

Electoral performance

Parliament of the Balearic Islands

Cortes Generales

European Parliament

Notes

References

People's Party (Spain)
Political parties in the Balearic Islands